Events from the 1150s in England.

Incumbents
Monarch – Stephen (to 25 October 1154), then Henry II

Events
 1150
 Henry, son of Empress Matilda, becomes Duke of Normandy.
 The Anarchy: Worcester sacked.
 1151
 Henry pays homage to Louis VII of France, and cedes Vexin to France.
 During the troubles of Stephen's reign, King Eystein II of Norway took advantage of a civil war to plunder England's east coast.
 1152
 18 May – Henry marries Eleanor of Aquitaine, and claims rule over Aquitaine.
 The Anarchy: King Stephen besieges the last opposition stronghold, at Wallingford.
 The Anarchy: Roger de Berkeley is dispossessed of Berkeley Castle in Gloucestershire for withholding his allegiance from the Plantagenets and the Lordship of Berkeley is granted to Robert Fitzharding, founder of the Berkeley family which will still hold the castle in the 21st century.
 1153
 January – The Anarchy: Henry, Count of Anjou, arrives in England in a campaign against King Stephen in favour of his mother Empress Matilda.
 17 August – The Anarchy: Following the sudden death of Eustace IV, Count of Boulogne, Stephen's eldest son and heir apparent, at Bury St Edmunds, Theobald of Bec, Archbishop of Canterbury, mediates between Stephen and Henry.
 7 November – The Anarchy: Henry and Stephen seal the Treaty of Wallingford in Winchester Cathedral, ending the civil war.
 1154
 25 October – King Stephen dies and is succeeded by Henry II, the first Plantagenet king of England.
 4 December – Pope Adrian IV elected, the only English Pope.
 19 December – coronation of Henry II and Eleanor of Aquitaine at Westminster Abbey.
 Huntingdonshire is declared royal forest.
 The Anglo-Saxon Chronicle completed.
 Henry of Huntingdon completes his Historia Anglorum.
 1155
 January – Henry II appoints Thomas Becket as Lord Chancellor.
 Henry defeats rebellious barons, reclaims many royal castles, and abolishes the Earldoms of York and Hereford.
 Pope Adrian IV issues the papal bull Laudabiliter giving Henry II lordship over Ireland.
 Wace's Roman de Brut, an Anglo-Norman language semi-legendary history of Britain in verse, is completed.
 1156
 5 February – Henry pays homage to Louis VII of France to secure his titles over Normandy, Aquitaine, and Anjou.
 Henry suppresses a revolt by his brother Geoffrey in Anjou, and grants him the title Count of Nantes in return for securing peace.
 1157
 May – Henry II demands the return of Northumberland, Cumberland and Westmorland from Malcolm IV of Scotland; in return Malcolm is given the title Earl of Huntingdon.
 Summer – Henry II launches a campaign for overlordship of Wales.
 July – Owain Gwynedd submits to Henry and pays homage.
 Henry II grants special trading privileges to the Hansa merchants of Cologne.
 1158
 Summer – Henry II leaves for Normandy; he does not return to England until 1163.
 August – Henry agrees a treaty with Louis VII of France; Henry's son Henry the Young King to marry Louis' daughter Marguerite, in return for control of parts of Vexin.
 Conan IV, Duke of Brittany pays homage to Henry II.
 1159
 Henry besieges Toulouse to claim it as part of Aquitaine, but is forced to abandon the campaign.
 John of Salisbury completes his works Metalogicon and Polycraticus.
 Approximate date – churchman Richard FitzNeal is appointed Lord High Treasurer in charge of the royal Exchequer, an office he will hold for almost 40 years.

Births
 1150s – Nicolaa de la Haye, noblewoman and castellan (died 1230)
 1150
Rosamund Clifford, mistress of Henry II of England (approximate date; died 1176)
 Stephen Langton, Archbishop of Canterbury (approximate date; died 1228)
 1152
Geoffrey, Archbishop of York, illegitimate son of Henry II of England (approximate date; died 1212)
 1155
 28 February – Henry the Young King, son of Henry II of England (died 1183)
 1157
 8 September – King Richard I of England (died 1199)

Deaths
 1151
 23 April – Adeliza of Leuven, queen of Henry I of England (born 1103)
 1152
 3 May – Matilda of Boulogne, sovereign Countess of Boulogne and queen of Stephen of England (born 1105)
 1153
 17 August – Eustace IV of Boulogne, son of Stephen of England (born c. 1130)
 16 December – Ranulph de Gernon, 2nd Earl of Chester (born c. 1100)
Gilbert de Clare, 2nd Earl of Hertford (born 1115)
 1154
 20 February – Saint Wulfric of Haselbury Plucknett (born c. 1080)
 25 October – King Stephen of England (born 1096)
 1159
 1 September – Pope Adrian IV (born c. 1100)
 11 October – William of Blois, Earl of Surrey (born c. 1137)

References